Samuel ben Samson (also Samuel ben Shimshon) was a rabbi who lived in France and made a pilgrimage to Israel in 1210, visiting a number of villages and cities there, including Jerusalem. Amongst his companions were Jonathan ben David ha-Cohen, and it is likely that ben Samson served as Rabbi Jonathan's secretary. Two other rabbis were travelling with Samuel ben Samson and Rabbi Jonathan and the four travelled as far east as Mosul. According to George Sarton, some 300 English and French Jews who were inspired by ben Samson's account went to Palestine to settle there in 1211.

The first mention of Safed in Jewish history comes from ben Samson's 13th century writings, where he mentions the existence of a Jewish community of at least fifty members there.

References

Bibliography

13th-century French rabbis
French Orthodox rabbis
Holy Land travellers
Medieval Jewish travel writers
Pilgrimage accounts
13th-century travelers